In mathematics, Kähler differentials provide an adaptation of differential forms to arbitrary commutative rings or schemes. The notion was introduced by Erich Kähler in the 1930s. It was adopted as standard in commutative algebra and algebraic geometry somewhat later, once the need was felt to adapt methods from calculus and geometry over the complex numbers to contexts where such methods are not available.

Definition
Let  and  be commutative rings and  be a ring homomorphism. Kähler differentials formalize the observation that the derivatives of polynomials are again polynomial. In this sense, differentiation is a notion which can be expressed in purely algebraic terms. This observation can be turned into a definition of the module

of differentials in different, but equivalent ways.

Definition using derivations
The module of Kähler differentials is defined as the -module  for which there is a universal derivation . As with other universal properties, this means that  is the best possible derivation in the sense that any other derivation may be obtained from it by composition with an -module homomorphism. In other words, the composition with  provides, for every  , an -module isomorphism

,
,
,
The relations imply that the universal derivation is a homomorphism of -modules.

Definition using the augmentation ideal
Another construction proceeds by letting  be the ideal in the tensor product  defined as the kernel of the multiplication map

Then the module of Kähler differentials of  can be equivalently defined by

and the universal derivation is the homomorphism  defined by

This construction is equivalent to the previous one because  is the kernel of the projection

Thus we have:

Taking the quotient by  precisely imposes the Leibniz rule.

Examples and basic facts

For any commutative ring , the Kähler differentials of the polynomial ring  are a free -module of rank n generated by the differentials of the variables:

Given two ring homomorphisms , there is a short exact sequence of -modules

If  for some ideal , the term  vanishes and the sequence can be continued at the left as follows:

A generalization of these two short exact sequences is provided by the cotangent complex.

The latter sequence and the above computation for the polynomial ring allows the computation of the Kähler differentials of finitely generated -algebras . Briefly, these are generated by the differentials of the variables and have relations coming from the differentials of the equations.  For example, for a single polynomial in a single variable,

Kähler differentials for schemes
Because Kähler differentials are compatible with localization, they may be constructed on a general scheme by performing either of the two definitions above on affine open subschemes and gluing. However, the second definition has a geometric interpretation that globalizes immediately. This construction therefore has a more geometric flavor, in the sense that the notion of first infinitesimal neighbourhood of the diagonal is thereby captured, via functions vanishing modulo functions vanishing at least to second order (see cotangent space for related notions). Moreover, it extends to a general morphism of schemes  by setting  to be the ideal of the diagonal in the fiber product . The cotangent sheaf , together with the derivation  defined analogously to before, is universal among -linear derivations of -modules.

Similar to the commutative algebra case, there exist exact sequences associated to morphisms of schemes.

Also, if  is a closed subscheme given by the ideal sheaf , then  and there is an exact sequence of sheaves on

Examples

Finite separable field extensions 
If  is a finite field extension, then  if and only if  is separable.

proves .

Cotangent modules of a projective variety 
Given a projective scheme , its cotangent sheaf can be computed from the sheafification of the cotangent module on the underlying graded algebra. For example, consider the complex curve

then we can compute the cotangent module as

Then,

Morphisms of schemes 
Consider the morphism

Then, using the first sequence we see that

hence

Higher differential forms and algebraic de Rham cohomology

de Rham complex
As before, fix a map . Differential forms of higher degree are defined as the exterior powers (over ),

The derivation  extends in a natural way to a sequence of maps

satisfying  This is a cochain complex known as the de Rham complex.

The de Rham complex enjoys an additional multiplicative structure, the wedge product

This turns the de Rham complex into a commutative differential graded algebra. It also has a coalgebra structure inherited from the one on the exterior algebra.

de Rham cohomology

(In many situations,  is the spectrum of a field of characteristic zero.) It is closely related to crystalline cohomology.

In this case, because affine schemes have no higher cohomology,  can be computed as the cohomology of the complex of abelian groups

which is, termwise, the global sections of the sheaves .

To take a very particular example, suppose that  is the multiplicative group over  Because this is an affine scheme, hypercohomology reduces to ordinary cohomology. The algebraic de Rham complex is

The differential  obeys the usual rules of calculus, meaning  The kernel and cokernel compute algebraic de Rham cohomology, so

and all other algebraic de Rham cohomology groups are zero.

Since the Betti numbers of these cohomology groups are not what is expected, crystalline cohomology was developed to remedy this issue; it defines a Weil cohomology theory over finite fields.

Grothendieck's comparison theorem
If  is a smooth complex algebraic variety, there is a natural comparison map of complexes of sheaves

This map is far from being an isomorphism. Nonetheless,  showed that the comparison map induces an isomorphism

from algebraic to smooth de Rham cohomology (and thus to singular cohomology  by de Rham's theorem). For example, if 

, 

Since X is homotopy equivalent to a circle, this is as predicted by Grothendieck's theorem. 

Other counterexamples can be found in algebraic plane curves with isolated singularities whose Milnor and Tjurina numbers are non-equal.

Applications

Canonical divisor
This implies, in particular, that

is a line bundle or, equivalently, a divisor. It is referred to as the canonical divisor. The canonical divisor is, as it turns out, a dualizing complex and therefore appears in various important theorems in algebraic geometry such as Serre duality or Verdier duality.

Classification of algebraic curves
The geometric genus of a smooth algebraic variety  of dimension  over a field  is defined as the dimension

For curves, this purely algebraic definition agrees with the topological definition (for ) as the "number of handles" of the Riemann surface associated to X. There is a rather sharp trichotomy of geometric and arithmetic properties depending on the genus of a curve, for  being 0 (rational curves), 1 (elliptic curves), and greater than 1 (hyperbolic Riemann surfaces, including hyperelliptic curves), respectively.

Tangent bundle and Riemann–Roch theorem
The tangent bundle of a smooth variety  is, by definition, the dual of the cotangent sheaf . The Riemann–Roch theorem and its far-reaching generalization, the Grothendieck–Riemann–Roch theorem, contain as a crucial ingredient the Todd class of the tangent bundle.

Unramified and smooth morphisms
The sheaf of differentials is related to various algebro-geometric notions. A morphism  of schemes is unramified if and only if  is zero. A special case of this assertion is that for a field ,  is separable over  iff , which can also be read off the above computation.

A morphism  of finite type is a smooth morphism if it is flat and if  is a locally free -module of appropriate rank.

Periods
Periods are, broadly speaking, integrals of certain arithmetically defined differential forms.

Algebraic de Rham cohomology is used to construct periods as follows: For an algebraic variety  defined over  the above-mentioned compatibility with base-change yields a natural isomorphism

Choosing bases of these rational subspaces (also called lattices), the determinant of the base-change matrix is a complex number, well defined up to multiplication by a rational number. Such numbers are periods.

Algebraic number theory
In algebraic number theory, Kähler differentials may be used to study the ramification in an extension of algebraic number fields.  If  is a finite extension with rings of integers  and  respectively then the different ideal , which encodes the ramification data, is the annihilator of the -module :

Related notions
Hochschild homology is a homology theory for associative rings that turns out to be closely related to Kähler differentials. This is because of the Hochschild-Kostant-Rosenberg theorem which states that the Hochschild homology  of an algebra of a smooth variety is isomorphic to the de-Rham complex  for  a field of characteristic . A  derived  enhancement of this theorem states that the Hochschild homology of a differential graded algebra is isomorphic to the derived de-Rham complex.

The de Rham–Witt complex is, in very rough terms, an enhancement of the de Rham complex for the ring of Witt vectors.

Notes

References

 (letter to Michael Atiyah, October 14, 1963)

External links
 Notes on p-adic algebraic de-Rham cohomology - gives many computations over characteristic 0 as motivation
 A thread devoted to the relation on algebraic and analytic differential forms
 Differentials (Stacks project)

Commutative algebra
Differential algebra
Algebraic geometry
Cohomology theories